A slide show (or slideshow) is an on-screen presentation of information/ideas presented on slides. Forms of slideshows include:
 Diaporama
 Multi-image

Slide show may also refer to:

In television
 SlideShow (TV series), a 2013 Australian television comedy game show
 Slide Show, a 2014 Indonesian television comedy game show

In music
 Slide Show (album), an album by guitarist Ralph Towner
 Slideshows (album), the second album by Australian band Thirsty Merc